Tomorrow Is Another Day is the second collaborative release by German electronic musician Ulrich Schnauss and Engineers' Mark Peters, released on 25 October 2013 through Bureau B.

Track listing

Personnel

Musicians
 Ulrich Schnauss: Synthesizer, piano, vocals.
 Mark Peters: Guitar, bass, vocals.

Producers
 Produced and mixed by Mark Peters and Ulrich Schnauss at home in York and London respectively.
 Mastering by Bo Kondron at Calyx Mastering, Berlin.

Other appearances
 "There's Always Tomorrow" from the album also appeared on the compilation album 'Possibilities of Circumstance' on Projekt which features acts such as Steve Roach and Hans Joachim Roedelius.

References

External links
 Interview with Schnauss & Peters - Echoes Blog Podcast

2013 albums
Ulrich Schnauss albums
Bureau B albums